USS LST-909 was an  in the United States Navy. Like many of her class, she was not named and is properly referred to by her hull designation.

Construction
LST-909 was laid down on 19 February 1944, at Hingham, Massachusetts, by the Bethlehem-Hingham Shipyard; launched on 3 April 1944; and commissioned on 11 May 1944.

Service history
During World War II, LST-909 was assigned to the Asiatic-Pacific theater. She took part in the 
Luzon operation, the Lingayen Gulf landings, in January 1945; and the Assault and occupation of Okinawa Gunto, in April 1945.

Immediately following World War II, LST-909 performed occupation duty in the Far East until early February 1946. She returned to the United States and was decommissioned on 21 June 1946, and struck from the Navy list on 31 July, that same year. On 19 May 1948, the ship was sold to Kaiser Shipyards, Vancouver, Washington, for scrapping.

Awards
LST-909 earned two battle star for World War II service.

Notes

Citations

Bibliography 

Online resources

External links
 

 

LST-542-class tank landing ships
World War II amphibious warfare vessels of the United States
Ships built in Hingham, Massachusetts
1944 ships